Class F or F class may refer to:

 NZR F class, steam locomotives used in New Zealand
  Class F, a stellar classification
 Class F, a type of race car sometimes referred to as F-P as well, for F-Production
 Class F, an airspace class defined by the ICAO
 Class F, a designation for model aircraft defined by the Fédération Aéronautique Internationale
 F Class or CIE 501 Class, a narrow gauge diesel locomotive used on the former West Clare Railway in Ireland
 F-Class (shooting sport), a high power rifle discipline
 F-class escort ship, ships used by the Kriegsmarine during the Second World War
 F-class destroyer (disambiguation), several classes of ships
 F-class submarine (disambiguation), several classes of submarines
 Class F cable, a telecommunications cable
 Class F fire, a class used for fire extinguishers
 Class F fly ash
 F-segment, a European vehicle size class
 F class, code used by some airlines for first class

See also
 F type (disambiguation)